Teodoro Cruz Bacani Jr. (born 16 January 1940) is a Filipino prelate of the Catholic Church and a professed member of the Dominican Order, who become the first bishop of Novaliches on 7 December 2002 until 25 November 2003, He previously served as Auxiliary Bishop of Manila from 1984 to 2002.

Career
Bacani was a former dean and professor in theology at the San Carlos Seminary. He served as auxiliary bishop of the Archdiocese of Manila for 18 years. He is also the spiritual advisor of the El Shaddai charismatic group.

Following the creation of the Diocese of Novaliches in December 7, 2002 by Pope John Paul II, Bacani was appointed as its first bishop. He was appointed as bishop of the diocese on January 16, 2003, on his 63rd birthday. In April 2003, Bacani was accused of sexually harassing his 33-year old personal secretary. He denied the allegations but admitted to making "inappropriate expression of affection" to her. He was backed by the diocese and El Shaddai who expressed confidence in Bacani.  He resigned from the position in November 25, 2003.

On August 15, 2019 Bacani joined the Order of Preachers.

Political involvement
Bacani was among the critics of the administration of former president and dictator Ferdinand Marcos. He was among the framers of the 1987 Constitution of the Philippines.

Bacani was critical of the Disbursement Acceleration Program (DAP) of the administration of President Benigno Aquino III which he says is just used as a means for bribery. He alleged the DAP was used to bribe senators so that Renato Corona could be impeached.

Bacani also oppose the purchase of contraceptives by the Philippine government which he believes is detrimental.

Bacani joined other members of the clergy in condemning the war on drugs of President Rodrigo Duterte.

For the 2022 presidential elections, Bacani disavowed El Shaddai leader's Mike Velarde's endorsement of then-candidate Bongbong Marcos's campaign. While he maintain he respect's Velarde's position, he called the endorsement as "very wrong" pointing out the reputation of the Marcos family's corruption.

References

Filipino Roman Catholic bishops
Dominican bishops

1940 births

Living people